Asena Yalçın (born 4 April 1991) is a Turkish basketball player for Çukurova Basketbol and the Turkish national team.

She participated at the 2018 FIBA Women's Basketball World Cup.

References

External links

1991 births
Living people
Mersin Büyükşehir Belediyesi women's basketball players
Point guards
Sportspeople from Adana
Turkish women's basketball players
Galatasaray S.K. (women's basketball) players